Patrick Joseph Lucey (May 2, 1873 – November 17, 1947) was an American politician and lawyer.

Born in Streator, Illinois, Lucey studied law in Chicago, Illinois and was admitted to the Illinois bar in 1894. He then practiced law in Streator, Illinois. Lucey served as city attorney of Streator from 1897 to 1901, and then served as mayor of Streator from 1903 to 1907 and from 1909 to 1909. Lucey was a Democrat. From 1913 to 1917 Lucey served as Illinois Attorney General. Then, Lucey was appointed to the Illinois Public Utilities Commission in 1917 and served until 1920. He then practiced law in Chicago. Illinois and died there in 1947.

Notes

1871 births
1947 deaths
Politicians from Chicago
People from Streator, Illinois
Illinois Democrats
Illinois lawyers
Mayors of places in Illinois
Illinois Attorneys General